Bruno Pereira Bonicontro (born April 20, 1991) is a former American and Brazilian footballer who played as a midfielder/left-back.

Career

Professional
In August 2013 he signed with Novo Esporte Clube, in the Campeonato Mineiro.

On 2014 Bruno Bonicontro signed with Ipatinga Futebol Clube.

On 2016 Bruno Bonicontro Signed with Boston City Football Club.

In December 2016 Boston City Football Club loaned Bruno Bonicontro to Cianorte Futebol Clube to play Campeonato Paranaense.

Personal life

In 2017, Bonicontro co-founded FC Flair, a Massachusetts youth futsal academy, with Ronaldo Vieira, a teammate from Boston City FC. He currently serves as Director of Coaching.

References

External links
UMass Lowell

 Novo Esporte FC
Ipatinga FC

Bruno Bonicontro at playmakerstats.com (English version of ogol.com.br)

1991 births
Living people
Soccer players from Massachusetts
Sportspeople from Framingham, Massachusetts
American soccer players
Brazilian footballers
American people of Brazilian descent
Worcester Hydra players
Ipatinga Futebol Clube players
USL League Two players
Boston City FC players
Association football midfielders
Association football fullbacks